Aziz Abbas (born 3 March 1943) is an Iraqi weightlifter. He competed in the 1964 Summer Olympics.

References

1943 births
Living people
Weightlifters at the 1964 Summer Olympics
Iraqi male weightlifters
Olympic weightlifters of Iraq